Bacúrov is a village and municipality of the Zvolen District in the Banská Bystrica Region of Slovakia.

History
The earliest written reference of Bacúrov dates from 1255 when the village was known as Villa Bochorou (Wasseraw in old German). Historical background of Bacúrov reflects the geographical location of the village. Situated near well known historical mining towns of Banská Štiavnica, Banská Bystrica and Kremnica, the village was in the spotlight of many historical events. In mid-16th century during Turkish invasions, the local villagers were responsible for road guarding. Tatars were also threatening the existence of the village. In late 16th century, they used to camp just on the outskirts of Bacúrov and Ostrá Lúka.

Population

Religious composition

Genealogical resources

The records for genealogical research are available at the state archive "Statny Archiv in Banska Bystrica, Slovakia"

 Roman Catholic church records (births/marriages/deaths): 1786-1912 (parish A)
 Lutheran church records (births/marriages/deaths): 1738-1909
 Census records 1869 of Bacurov are not available at the state archive.

See also
 List of municipalities and towns in Slovakia

External links
WebCite query result
www.Tourist-Channel.sk -
Surnames of living people in Bacurov
Bacúrov - Okres Zvolen - E-OBCE.sk

Villages and municipalities in Zvolen District